The Heartbreak Kid is a 1972 American black comedy romance film directed by Elaine May and written by Neil Simon, starring Charles Grodin, Cybill Shepherd, Jeannie Berlin, Audra Lindley, Eddie Albert, and Doris Roberts. It is based on the short story "A Change of Plan", written by Bruce Jay Friedman and first published in Esquire in 1966.

At the 45th Academy Awards, Jeannie Berlin was nominated for Best Supporting Actress, and Eddie Albert for Best Supporting Actor. It was ranked #91 on AFI's 100 Years... 100 Laughs, a list of the funniest American films ever made, and was remade in 2007.

Plot

In New York City, after a very short courtship, emotionally shallow, self-absorbed Lenny Cantrow (Charles Grodin), a sporting goods salesman, is married to Lila (Jeannie Berlin, daughter of director Elaine May), an earnest young woman who expects long-term emotional commitment of Lenny.

During their honeymoon in Miami Beach, Lenny meets and pursues the beautiful but shallow Kelly Corcoran (Cybill Shepherd), a college student on holiday with her wealthy parents. When Lila is severely sunburned, Lenny quarantines her to their hotel room as he engages in a series of rendezvous with Kelly, lying to Lila about his whereabouts. Lenny impulsively ends his marriage to pursue an indifferent Kelly, explaining that she is the woman he has been waiting for all of his life and just "timed it wrong".

After leaving Lila after only five days of marriage, he follows Kelly to Minnesota, where her resentful and  protective father (Eddie Albert) stands in his way. Following an awkward dinner where Lenny inanely praises Midwestern produce as having "no deceit", Mr. Corcoran offers Lenny a $25,000 bribe to leave. Lenny angrily refuses and soon marries Kelly.

At the reception, his attempt to mingle with the attendees via mindless conversation fails and he is ignored by the guests, his bride, and new in-laws. He is soon reduced to quoting cliches to two uncomprehending children and is soon left alone, humming to himself while the party continues around him.

Cast

 Charles Grodin as Lenny Cantrow
 Cybill Shepherd as Kelly Corcoran
 Jeannie Berlin as Lila Kolodny
 Audra Lindley as Mrs. Corcoran
 Eddie Albert as Mr. Corcoran
 Mitchell Jason as Cousin Ralph
 William Prince as Colorado Man
 Augusta Dabney as Colorado Woman
 Doris Roberts as Mrs. Cantrow
 Marilyn Putnam as Mrs. Kolodny
 Jack Hausman as Mr. Kolodny
 Erik Lee Preminger as Pecan Pie Waiter
 Art Metrano as Entertainer
 Tim Browne as Kelly's Boyfriend
 Jean Scoppa as Flower Girl
 Greg Scherick as Young Boy

Style
The film is a black comedy, examining love and hypocrisy through a lens of pointed, subtle humor. Though it contains broad jokes, occasionally going for "laughs without shame", Elaine May is credited with emotionally grounding the film and providing "a real understanding of character" through eliciting the kind of "caustic, almost powerful humor that comes from moments of wincing recognition when human foibles are accurately captured and revealed". As another reviewer wrote in Sight & Sound, May's strength lies in her "obsessive and affectionate observations of character".

May shared with her late comedy partner Mike Nichols (1931–2014) a sparse, dialogue-oriented style and a quizzical perspective. She places an emphasis on character comedy; The Hollywood Reporter commented on her stylistic decisions to derive humor "from situations rather than obvious one-line jokes" and make comedic choices which "flow effortlessly from rhythmic dialogue, explosions of laughter". The New Yorker's Pauline Kael wrote: "Elaine May has the rarest kind of comic gift: the ability to create a world seen comically".

May's focus on comedic honesty, backlit by pain and misfortune, stylistically influenced a new generation of films. She pushed comedy into a "golden age as the result of the rise of the semi-surreal comedy of mishap, pain, insult, and desperation".

Themes

Love and Jewish identity 
The Heartbreak Kid is a particularly Jewish story; as Thomas Meehan wrote in The Saturday Review, the film is a "triumph of New York Jewish humor", and The Village Voice called it "the culminating work of Hollywood's Jewish new wave". All the filmmakers are Jewish—Friedman, Simon, May, the producer Edgar J. Scherick, and the composers Burt Bacharach and Hal David. The story follows Lenny Cantrow, the embodiment of the Jewish archetype of the "schlemiel" (bungler), as he dumps Lila (Jeannie Berlin), a "kvetchy Jew" and "sloppy, incipient yenta", for the girl of his dreams, an all-American WASP. The film is a deadpan fever dream of shiksa-chasing, taking place in what Bruce Jay Friedman dubs in the original short story as the land of "strange blonde people".

The character of Lila in particular has been labelled extremely stereotypical; Film Quarterly likened her to a female Portnoy, publishing a review stating "Philip Roth's friendly anti-Semitism is strikingly similar to Friedman's". Some critics have expressed concerns that the movie forwards a stilted vision of the modern female Jew and implicitly asks the question: "Why be married to a cloying, unsophisticated, slightly overweight Jewish girl who speaks with a discernible sing-song Jewish intonation (Yiddish influence) when you can perhaps conquer a very Waspy-looking, knockout blonde shiksa type?" This is despite the intentions of Jeannie Berlin, who told The New York Times that she did her best to honor the character and give Lila depth: "You see, I didn't want to make that girl stupid. It would have been so easy to do Lila stupid. I don't think Lila was stupid. I think every single thing she did was justified to her... And she really was terrifically in love". For the role of Lila, Simon wanted Diane Keaton, but May thought the intended contrast between Jewish and gentile wouldn't be strong enough.

Lenny's behavior as a classic nebbish Jew is thoughtless, as he leaves Lila high and dry on their honeymoon. Charles Grodin said afterwards that although he played the character with full sincerity, he had "pretty much indelibly stamped [himself] into the moviegoing public's consciousness as a jerk". Still, he said, many viewers misread the film as an illustration of precisely Jewish annoyances and not as critique: "The number of men who tell me how much they loved the movie and how much they identified with the character, while flattering, is also somewhat frightening".

The final moments of the film depict Lenny failing to communicate with Kelly's gentile family. It highlights how he gave up his personal cultural traditions, and how he misses them. Having walked down the aisle to Kelly as a large cross hung overhead, Lenny sits on the couch by himself, swimming in a sea of Christianity, listless and alienated as ever.

Reception
The film has received almost universal praise from critics. Rotten Tomatoes gives the film an approval rating of 92% based on reviews from 59 critics, with an average rating of 7.6/10. On Metacritic, the film has a weighted average score of 74 out of 100, based on 12 critics, indicating "generally favorable reviews".

Vincent Canby of The New York Times declared it to be "a first-class American comedy, as startling in its way as was The Graduate". Roger Ebert of the Chicago Sun-Times gave the film 3.5 stars out of 4 in a review that concludes: "It's a comedy, but there's more in it than that; it's a movie about the ways we pursue, possess, and consume each other as sad commodities". Gene Siskel of the Chicago Tribune awarded the same 3.5/4 grade and wrote that "the heavy-handed comedy undermines the serious aspect of the movie—we really can't believe that Lenny would marry her in the first place. The overall high quality of the acting, however, does sustain the film". Whitney Williams in Variety called it a "bright, amusing saga" until the "audience is jolted by a sudden shut-off ending with no climax whatsoever". Charles Champlin of the Los Angeles Times wrote that Grodin and Berlin "bring off hugely difficult comedy assignment with great style. Amidst increasing farcical events, they both somehow manage to preserve a sense of credible, foolish but sympathetic individuals lurking beneath the follies". Gary Arnold of The Washington Post thought that the film "has its faults, but it's also one of the most entertaining and original American film comedies of the last few years". The Independent Film Journal called it an "unquestionably brilliant comedy".

Variety noted in its review that the sudden ending of the film might have been indicative of another ending that had been planned and later noted that Fox handed a synopsis at later screenings mentioning an ending where "as they sail for Europe on their honeymoon, Lenny makes some startling discoveries about Kelly - and 'The Heartbreak Kid' comes to its bitingly funny end".

Accolades

American Film Institute
In 2000, the film was ranked 91st in the American Film Institute's 100 Years...100 Laughs list.

Home media
Although released on DVD in 1998 and in 2002, the film currently (as of 2022) is out of print. In 2022 it was announced the Brooklyn Academy of Music would offer a rare screening the film.

Remake
A remake of the film was released in 2007 that stars Ben Stiller, Michelle Monaghan, Malin Åkerman, Jerry Stiller, Rob Corddry, Carlos Mencia, Scott Wilson, and Danny McBride.

See also
 List of American films of 1972

Notes

References

External links
 
 
 
 
 

1972 films
1970s black comedy films
1970s romantic comedy-drama films
20th Century Fox films
ABC Motion Pictures films
American black comedy films
American romantic comedy-drama films
American satirical films
Films about Jews and Judaism
Films about marriage
Films based on short fiction
Films based on works by Bruce Jay Friedman
Films directed by Elaine May
Films set in Miami
Films set in Minnesota
Films set in New York City
Films shot in Miami
Films shot in Minnesota
American interfaith romance films
Films with screenplays by Neil Simon
1972 comedy films
1972 drama films
1970s English-language films
1970s American films